The 1978 Yegoryevsk Tu-144 crash occurred during a test flight of a Tupolev Tu-144 on 23 May 1978. The aircraft suffered a fuel leak, which led to an in-flight fire in the right wing, forcing the shutdown of two of the aircraft's four engines. One of the two remaining engines subsequently failed, forcing the crew to make a belly landing in a field near Yegoryevsk, Moscow Oblast. Two flight engineers were killed in the ensuing crash, but the remaining six crew members survived. The accident prompted a ban on passenger flights of the Tu-144, which had already been beset by numerous problems, leading to a lack of interest that ultimately resulted in the Tu-144 program's cancellation.

Aircraft and crew
The aircraft was a supersonic Tupolev Tu-144D, registered СССР-77111, built at the Voronezh Aircraft Production Association facility and destined for Soviet flag carrier Aeroflot. It had first flown on 27 April 1978 and completed test flights on 12 May, 16 May, and 18 May, as well as another test flight earlier on the day of the accident. The accident flight was to have been the aircraft's sixth test flight. Eight crewmembers were on board.

Accident
The aircraft took off from Ramenskoye Airport near Moscow at 17:30 local time on 23 May 1978. At 18:44:44 local time, the crew started the APU. Shortly thereafter, at 18:49:15, the crew shut off the APU. Nine seconds later, a fire alarm was triggered; the number 3 engine was shut down at 18:49:31. The crew decided to attempt a return to Ramenskoye Airport. At 18:51:14, the number 4 engine shut down. The crew subsequently noticed a burning smell and thick smoke in the cabin. The number one engine then shut down at 18:53:27; with three of the aircraft's four engines shut down, it was impossible to return to the airport. The nose cone collapsed on impact, penetrating a compartment in which two flight engineers were seated and killing them both, while the remaining six crewmembers survived the crash. The aircraft continued to burn for about an hour after the crash before the fire was extinguished by firefighters.

Investigation
Investigators found that a fuel leak had occurred in the aircraft's right wing 27 minutes before the fire started. The leaked fuel ignited when the aircraft's auxiliary power unit was turned on. The precise cause of the fuel leak could not be determined, as the components were heavily damaged by fire.

Aftermath
The crash resulted in a ban on passenger flights of the Tu-144. Combined with other issues involving the Tu-144, including an earlier crash at the 1973 Paris Air Show and complaints about reliability and passenger comfort, this caused a lack of interest in the Tu-144, which ultimately led to the demise of the Tu-144 program.

See also
The earlier TU-144 Crash - 1973 Paris Air Show Tu-144 crash
The only British-French Concorde crash - Air France Flight 4590

References

Aviation accidents and incidents in 1978
Accidents and incidents involving the Tupolev Tu-144
Aviation accidents and incidents in the Soviet Union
Airliner accidents and incidents caused by in-flight fires
1978 in the Soviet Union
Airliner accidents and incidents involving belly landings